Hao Fushen (born 17 November 1999) is a Chinese actor.

Early life and education 
Hao was born in Dalian, Liaoning on November 17, 1999. He enrolled in Beijing Film Academy in the year 2017.

The actors that Hao admires are Peng Yuchang and Masaki Suda.

Career

2019–present: Beginnings 
In 2019, Hao made his acting debut in the drama series Our Shiny Days. 

In 2020, Hao starred in the drama Hikaru No Go, based on the Japanese manga series.

Filmography

Television series

Awards and nominations

References

External links 

 
 

1999 births
Living people
Beijing Film Academy alumni
Male actors from Dalian
21st-century Chinese male actors
Chinese male television actors